Neches High School is a public high school located in unincorporated Neches, Texas, and classified as a 1A school by the UIL. It is part of the Neches Independent School District located in central Anderson County. In 2013, the school was rated "Met Standard" by the Texas Education Agency.

Athletics
The Neches Tigers compete in the following sports 

Baseball
Basketball
Cross Country
Golf
Softball
Tennis
Track and Field
Volleyball

State titles
Neches (UIL)
Girls Basketball 
1973(B), 1976(B), 2010(1A/D2), 2011(1A/D2), 2012(1A/D2)
Volleyball
2018-2019 (1A), 2019-2020 (1A), 2020-2021 (1A)

State finalists
Neches (UIL)
Boys Basketball 
2004(1A/D2)
Girls Basketball 
1975(1A), 2009(1A/D2)

Neches Clemons (PVIL)
Boys Basketball 
1961(PVIL-1A)

References

External links
Neches ISD

Schools in Anderson County, Texas
Public high schools in Texas